Martín Mallo (born 20 July 1950) is an Argentine equestrian. He competed in two events at the 1984 Summer Olympics.

References

1950 births
Living people
Argentine male equestrians
Olympic equestrians of Argentina
Equestrians at the 1984 Summer Olympics
Place of birth missing (living people)